Christopher Weatherhead, also known by his alias "Nerdo", is a Northampton University student who was jailed for his involvement in several cyberattacks by Anonymous.

Anonymous
Weatherhead has been an active leader for Anonymous, a loose-knit group of "hacktivists". It was reported that Weatherhead hosted an election of Anonymous members to pick the group's next target.

Operation Payback
Weatherhead played a large role in Operation Payback, a series of cyberattacks conducted by Anonymous against various organizations because the hackers "did not agree with their views." In particular, Weatherhead was known for his work on Operation Avenge Assange, which was part of Operation Payback as a whole. Operation Avenge Assange focused on disrupting PayPal and other payment sites that despite transferring funds indiscriminately for other organisations, including neonazi organisations, would not process transfers to the Wau Holland Foundation, which raises funds for WikiLeaks, after attention shifted from companies involved in digital rights. Weatherhead reportedly was instrumental in bringing down PayPal for 10 days, resulting in £3.5million in losses for the company.

In January 2013, Weatherhead was sentenced to 18 months in prison for his part in the denial-of-service attacks on PayPal, Visa and MasterCard in December 2010. An officer involved in bringing in Weatherhead said that he was particularly easy to find because he had been using the nickname "Nerdo" for "quite some time".

References

Cybercrime in the United Kingdom
Anonymous (hacker group) activists
Year of birth missing (living people)
Living people
Alumni of the University of Northampton
Hacktivists